Light Me Up is the debut studio album by American rock band The Pretty Reckless. It was released on August 27, 2010, by Interscope Records. The album received commercial success with the singles "Make Me Wanna Die", "Miss Nothing", and "Just Tonight".

Background

The recording process started in 2008, after Taylor Momsen met producer Kato Khandwala and his partner, songwriter Ben Phillips. By mid-2009, they felt they had found an authentic sound. Two months before the album's release, the band released an eponymous EP containing four songs expected to appear in the then-future record. However, the song "Zombie" was not present in the initial track listing, later appearing on the North and South American release.

The album received much more success in the United Kingdom, where it was released months before the American release. The warmer British reception spanned the singles "Miss Nothing" and "Just Tonight", which were not released anywhere else.

Singles
"Make Me Wanna Die" was released on April 14, 2010, as the album's lead single. A promotional video was released which features live performances and backstage footage of the band. This video is widely recognized as a viral version and was released on May 13, 2010. The official music video was postponed due to legal issues involving censorship, but premiered on September 15, 2010, on iTunes and Vevo.

"Miss Nothing" was released on August 18, 2010, only in the UK and Australia. The music video for "Miss Nothing" premiered on July 20, 2010.

"Just Tonight" was released on December 27, 2010, only in the UK after being pushed back from November 9. The music video premiered on November 2.

Critical reception

Light Me Up received generally positive reviews from music critics. At Metacritic, which assigns a normalized rating out of 100 to reviews from mainstream publications, the album received an average score of 74, based on five reviews. Alexey Eremenko of AllMusic wrote that Taylor Momsen "com[es] across as the strongest and bitchiest female vocalist to front an alt-rock band since Garbage's Shirley Manson" and added, "If the band had explored their bluesy leanings more, Light Me Up could have been a small-scale revolution, but even as it stands now, it's still a wicked good record." Rick Florino of Artistdirect stated that "Momsen's ability to mix a soulful swagger with a heavy metal grit makes for one of the best debuts of 2011", concluding that "The Pretty Reckless strike the most perfect balance between sexy swagger and brilliant songwriting."

At The New York Times, Jon Caramanica described the album as "terrific fun: salacious, convincingly muscular, unnervingly rowdy." Leah Greenblatt of Entertainment Weekly opined that the album is "clearly built from the doll parts of [the] grunge goddesses [of the 1990s]—a sometimes too-slick conceit that Momsen's thousand-Marlboro growl still manages to sell surprisingly well." Virgin Media's Ian Gittins noted that the album is "sparky and vivacious enough to hint that Ms Momsen, should she so wish, may even be able to give up the day job." IGN's Chad Grischow expressed, "Despite some lyrical clumsiness and overbearing production, there is a lot to like about The Pretty Reckless on their debut; enough to leave you hoping they work out the kinks on their sophomore set." John Longbottom of Kerrang! commented, "While lyrically there's nothing explicitly offensive, there are enough risque lines here to raise a few eyebrows, and enough good songs to prick a few ears."

Commercial performance
Light Me Up debuted at number 65 on the Billboard 200, selling 9,000 copies in its first week. As of October 2016, it had sold 132,000 copies in the United States. The album debuted at number six on the UK Albums Chart with 11,916 copies sold in its first week. On January 12, 2018, the album was certified gold by the British Phonographic Industry (BPI), denoting shipments in excess of 100,000 copies.

Track listing

Personnel
Credits adapted from the liner notes of Light Me Up.

The Pretty Reckless
 Taylor Momsen – vocals ; backing vocals 
 Ben Phillips – guitar ; backing vocals 
 Jamie Perkins – drums ; percussion

Additional personnel

 Kato Khandwala – production, engineering, mixing, guitar ; bass ; programming ; percussion ; string arrangement 
 Michael "Mitch" Milan – engineering assistance 
 James Frazee – engineering assistance ; additional engineering 
 Jon Cohan – drum tech 
 John Bender – backing vocals 
 Dave Eggar – cello 
 John Dinklage – violin 
 Dan Korneff – mix engineering 
 David Sonenberg – executive production
 William Derella – executive production
 Robert Fisher – art direction
 Lauren Dukoff – photography

Charts

Certifications

Release history

References

2010 debut albums
Interscope Records albums
Polydor Records albums
The Pretty Reckless albums